Makriyannis is a Greek surname. Notable people with the surname include:

Alexandros Makriyannis (born 1939), American medical researcher
Yannis Makriyannis (1797–1864), Greek merchant, military author, politician, and author

Greek-language surnames